Easton Press, a division of MBI, Inc., based in Norwalk, Connecticut, is a publisher specializing in premium leather-bound books. In addition to canonical classics, religion, poetry and art books, they publish a selection of science fiction and popular literature.

Some of Easton Press's products are arranged in monthly subscription series.

Style 
The Easton Press uses a number of elements of older publishing and book-binding styles, including gilt edges, raised bands on the spine, and ribbon markers. It commissions illustrations for its editions, including from prominent illustrators like Arthur Szyk, David Gentleman and Chris Van Allsburg, who illustrated its editions of C.S. Lewis's Chronicles of Narnia.

Book series
Over the years The Easton Press has published a number of book series including The 100 Greatest Books Ever Written, Masterpieces of American Literature, The Library of American Presidents (also known as: The Library of the Presidents), The Library of American History, Roger Tory Peterson Field Guides, Library of Fly-Fishing Classics, and The Masterpieces of Science Fiction.

See also
 Danbury Mint, another MBI division
 Franklin Library
 Folio Society

References

External links
Easton Press
MBI Publishing division

Companies based in Norwalk, Connecticut
Book publishing companies based in Connecticut
Publishing companies established in 1978
Publishing companies established in 1980
American companies established in 1978
American companies established in 1980
1978 establishments in Connecticut